The 2000 Tour de la Région Wallonne was the 27th edition of the Tour de Wallonie cycle race and was held on 29 July to 3 August 2000. The race started in Aubel and finished in Charleroi. The race was won by Axel Merckx.

General classification

References

Tour de Wallonie
Tour de la Région Wallonne